Mamadalevo (Mämädäl) is a rural locality (a village) in Sukkulovsky Selsoviet, Dyurtyulinsky District, Bashkortostan, Russia. The population was 183 as of 2010. There are 3 streets.

Geography 
Mamadalevo is located 11 km southeast of Dyurtyuli (the district's administrative centre) by road. Sukkulovo is the nearest rural locality.

References 

Rural localities in Dyurtyulinsky District